Call of the Circus is a little-seen 1930 film written by Maxine Alton and directed by Frank O'Connor. The film stars Francis X. Bushman and Ethel Clayton. The film is noted as silent screen idol Bushman's first talkie.

Plot 
A retired clown (Bushman) tells a young woman (Wyndham) about his life under the big top and his troubles with his wife (Ethel Clayton). He falls for the young girl after rescuing her from peril, but she falls in love with a young man (William C. Kirby). Eventually he realizes his love for his wife and son, and the three return to the circus.

Starring 
 Francis X. Bushman as The Man
 Ethel Clayton as The Woman    
 Joan Wyndham as The Girl
 William C. Kirby as The Boy
 Dorothy Gay as Circus Performer
 Sunburnt Jim Wilson as The Shadow

Production 
Bushman signed a contract with Pickwick Pictures in July 1929. After the film's release, Bushman sued O'Connor and his production company for back wages, and won a full judgment of $2,500.

References 

1930 films
Circus films
Films directed by Frank O'Connor